Stoke Bridge  in  Ipswich carries Bridge Street (A137) over the point at which the River Gipping becomes the River Orwell. It carries traffic into Ipswich from the suburb of Over Stoke. The bridge consists of two separate structures and is just upstream from  Ipswich dock on a tidal section of the river.

In 1789, Robert Ransome moved to Ipswich begin the “Orwell Works company employeeing 1500 men. His fourth patent in 1808 was for improvements on the wheel and spring ploughs. He was then joined in business by his two sons and the firm “Ransome and Sons” was one of the first to build iron bridges. The Stoke Bridge at Ipswich was constructed by them in 1818.

History
There are records of a bridge existing on the site from the late 13th Century. The fact that the Domesday Book mentions Saint Mary at Stoke implies that a crossing existed much earlier. 

The bridge is featured in John Speed's map of Ipswich of 1610 and Joseph Hodskinson's map of 1783.

The southbound bridge has a plaque celebrating the bridge's erection over 1924 and 1925. The bridge was the southernmost crossing of the river in Ipswich until the construction of Orwell Bridge in the 1980s.

References

See also

Bridges across the River Orwell
Buildings and structures in Ipswich
Bridges completed in 1925